Apabad is a 2012 Nepal Drama film directed by Subash Koirala and starring Raj Ballav Koirala, Nisha Adhikari, Rabi Giri and Bijaya Giri.

Plot

The film depicts an encounter between Suyog (Raj Ballav Koirala) and his experiences in a lonely and secluded island after trying to escape his good for nothing fate.
Facing failures even before starting his career, Suyog decides to put an end to all his miseries. However, death betrays him and he reaches an isolated island where he faces a hard time for self survival.

On the other hand, Sunanda (Nisha Adhikari), is a friend in need to Suyog. However, after the supposed demise of her friend, the sympathy turns into love as the lady reads the boy's personal diary.

Suyog finally defeats loneliness and finds a way out of the abandoned land.

Cast 

Raj Ballav Koirala as Suyog
Nisha Adhikari as Sunanda

See also
Nisha Adhikari
Raj Ballav Koirala

References

2012 films
Nepalese drama films
2010s Nepali-language films

External links